Tymfaia is a former municipality in the Trikala regional unit, Thessaly, Greece. Since the 2011 local government reform it is part of the municipality Meteora, of which it is a municipal unit. The municipal unit has an area of 262.523 km2. Population 1,298 (2011). The seat of the municipality was in Koniskos.

References

Populated places in Trikala (regional unit)